J.A. Byrd Mercantile Store, also known as Nelson-Frazier Furniture, is a historic commercial building located at Eastover, Richland County, South Carolina. It was built about 1910, and is a two-story, three bay, brick building.  The front façade is faced with blond brick, marble, and cast stone. The first-floor has a three-bay arcade and the second story has three tall arched windows.

It was added to the National Register of Historic Places in 1986.

References 

Commercial buildings on the National Register of Historic Places in South Carolina
Commercial buildings completed in 1910
Buildings and structures in Richland County, South Carolina
National Register of Historic Places in Richland County, South Carolina